In Germany, smoking is widespread and is subject to very few and lax regulations compared to other countries in Europe.

Under federal law, the manufacture, import, distribution, and advertisement of tobacco is regulated whilst the 16 federal states of Germany each have their own legislation regarding smoking in public places, which range from relatively weak regulations to full smoking bans in all licensed premises, childcare facilities, schools and governmental institutions.

As of July 2016, nearly 40% of the German population live in a state which bans smoking in all restaurants, pubs, cafés and nightclubs (Bavaria, North Rhine-Westphalia, Saarland). The other 13 states permit smoking in designated rooms or in bars with a floor area of less than 75 square meters.

According to a 2013 micro-census survey, 24.5% of the German population aged fifteen years and over are smokers (29% of men, 20% of women). Among the 18–25 age group, 35.2% are smokers.

Statistics

Cigarette smoking among adults, 2013 

According to a 2013 microcensus, about one in four (24.5%) people aged 15 years and over was a smoker, 20.9% regularly, and only 3.6 occasionally. The rate of ex-smokers was 19.3%. The average age at which smokers begin is 17.8 years of age (in the age group of 15- to 20-year-olds the average age is 15.4 years)

Annual cigarette consumption per capita 

In 2010, an average of 229 million cigarettes were smoked every day, corresponding to 1,021 cigarettes per capita.

Cigarette consumption per day 

Amount of smoked cigarettes per day by age per Sozio-oekonomische Panel (SOEP) .

Tobacco consumption from 1991 until 2013 

Average amount of cigarettes smoked daily, by year.

Political measures against smoking

Misleading labels 

Since 2003 it is illegal to label a tobacco product as "light", "mild", "low-tar" or any other misleading form of advertisement which could cause the impression that the product causes less damage than other tobacco products.

Advertising 

All radio and television advertisement for tobacco products was banned in 1975. This regulation was extended by the "Rundfunkstaatsvertrag" on 1 August 1999, banning any kind of sponsoring of television and radio shows. In 2002, the "Protection of Young Persons Act" banned the advertising of tobacco products in cinemas before 6 p.m. On 1 January 2007, the European Tobacco advertisement directive came into effect, banning the advertising of tobacco products on the internet, in newspapers and magazines. The regulation also banned sponsorship of any event which is broadcast internationally.

Germany was the last EU member state to still legally permit billboard and cinema advertising for tobacco products, however this was changed by a new government regulation. Outdoor advertising is restricted in stages: From January 1, 2022, for tobacco products, from January 1, 2023, for tobacco heaters and from January 1, 2024, for e-cigarettes. Cinema advertising was banned in 2021.

Warning labels 

In accordance with EU Tobacco Products Directive II, all sold cigarettes, rolling tobacco and hookah tobacco manufacturers have to cover 65% of the packaging with combined pictorial and textual warning labels on both sides, in addition to warning labels on the smaller sides since May 2017.

Tobacco taxation 
 

In Germany the amount of tobacco and the value of the product is used to calculate the tax (§ 3 TabakStG). In order to calculate the tobacco tax for each package the number of cigarettes, cigars and cigarillos or the quantity in grams (smoking tobacco) and the retail selling price is required. The information is printed on the "Steuerbanderole" (tax strip) of each tobacco package in full Euro and cent values.

In 2002 and 2003, the tobacco tax was increased to finance anti-terrorist measures. In 2004 and 2005 three increases followed to financially support health insurance. In 2010 tax increases were decided for the next 5 successive years starting 1 May 2011 over 1 January 2012 to 1 January 2015.

As of 2015, the tobacco tax rate was 9.82 cents per cigarette and 21.69 percent of the retail price, which makes a minimum sum of 19.636 cents per cigarette minus the sales tax of the retail selling price.

Sale restrictions

Minors 

Under Germany's "Protection of Young Persons Act" it is unlawful to sell or supply any tobacco product to anyone who is under eighteen years of age. It is also illegal to permit minors to smoke in any public place. Although it is not a crime for minors to purchase, attempt to purchase or consume tobacco products it is unlawful for any retailer or other responsible person to sell, supply or tolerate the consumption of tobacco by a person underage. If a minor is found smoking in public, the police have a duty to seize the tobacco products.

Prior to 1 September 2007 the minimum age for purchasing and smoking tobacco products had been 16 years. Until 1 January 2009 all tobacco vending machines had to be removed or refitted to ensure that minors could not purchase tobacco products from them. Since then, all vending machines require some form of identification before dispensing tobacco, usually an Electronic cash bank card, German identity card or European driving licence, to verify that the buyer is at least 18 years of age.

Sale of loose cigarettes 

It is unlawful to sell any tobacco product in a package containing less than 19 cigarettes or 30 grams of loose fine-cut tobacco. To ensure this is the case, retailers may not destroy a tax strip on tobacco packaging. The law provides an exception for cigarillos and cigars under certain conditions.

Retail price maintenance 

Selling tobacco products for more or less than the retail sale price set by the manufacturer and printed on the tax strip is unlawful. The only exception is when providing free samples to a customer for advertising purpose.

Gaming and gambling 

Tobacco products may not be used as a prize in any form of commercial gaming or gambling.

Tie-on sales 

Adding or supplying anything else than the tobacco product to a package of cigarettes, cigars or cigarillos except for change is unlawful.

Federal smoking ban 

The "Federal non-smoking act" has introduced a smoking ban for the following public places and facilities:
 in federal institutions and the constitutional bodies of the federal government,
 in public transportation,
 in passenger stations of public railways.
The law does not apply to any residential or accommodation facility given to residents for personal use and allows for separated smoking facilities if the conditions apply which are set by the federal government.

Smoking ban by state

See also
Anti-tobacco movement in Nazi Germany

References